Pavlo-Obnorsky Monastery is a Russian Orthodox monastery founded by Pavel of Obnora in 1414. The monastery is located in the selo of Yunosheskoye on the bank of the Nurma River, a tributary of the Obnora River, in Gryazovetsky District in the southern part of Vologda Oblast, Russia. In the 17th century, this was one of the most influential monasteries in Russia. The monastery was abolished in 1924 and reestablished in 1994. As of 2011, it was one of the four acting monasteries in Vologda Oblast.

History
The monastery was founded by Pavel of Obnora. Pavel was looking for a remote place, and the area in the 15th century was covered by dense forests. The rules of the monastery, established by Pavel, were very strict by Russian standards. The first hegumen of the monastery was Alexios, a disciple of Pavel, and Pavel himself never took any formal role in the monastery. Some of the icons by Dionisius, one of the most famous Russian icon painters, were made in the monastery and have been preserved in the Tretyakov Gallery in Moscow. In 1538, the monastery was destroyed by Tatars. It was rebuilt, and the existing ensemble of the monastery was formed in the 16th-18th centuries. The idea was to build an image of New Jerusalem. To this end, two artificial hills were erected, one with a church and another one with a chapel. The monastery was abolished in 1924. The buildings were used to host a school, an orphanage, and a sanatorium. It was reestablished in 1994 as a metochion of the Spaso-Prilutsky Monastery. In 2003, the Pavlo-Obnorsky Monastery became an independent entity.

Architecture
The ensemble of the monastery was pretty much neglected after the monastery was abolished in 1926. The restoration works started in 1990s. The ensemble consists of 
 The Assumption Church (1867);
 The wooden Chapel of St. Pavel of Obnora (contemporary);
 The wooden Chapel of St. Pavel of Obnora at the spring (contemporary);
and the cells. The Trinity Church, built between 1505 and 1516, has been demolished.

The ensemble of the monastery, as well as separate buildings, are protected as cultural monuments of local significance.

References

Russian Orthodox monasteries in Russia
Religious organizations established in the 1410s
Christian monasteries established in the 15th century
Buildings and structures in Vologda Oblast
Cultural heritage monuments in Vologda Oblast
Objects of cultural heritage of Russia of regional significance